Hydantoin racemase (5'-monosubstituted-hydantoin racemase, HyuA, HyuE) is an enzyme with systematic name D-5-monosubstituted-hydantoin racemase. This enzyme catalyses the following chemical reaction

 D-5-monosubstituted hydantoin  L-5-monosubstituted hydantoin

This enzyme is a part of the reaction cascade known as the "hydantoinase process".

References

External links 
 

EC 5.1.99